Ryu Dam (born December 6, 1979), is a South Korean comedian and actor. He was a cast member in the variety show Law of the Jungle.

Filmography

Television series

Film

Variety Show

References

External links
 
 
 Ryu Dam Fan Cafe at Daum 
 
 

1979 births
Living people
South Korean male comedians
South Korean male television actors
South Korean television personalities
South Korean male film actors
Gag Concert
IHQ (company) artists